Simulation is the imitation of the operation of a real-world process or system over time.

Simulation or The Simulation may also refer to:
 Computer simulation, simulation (as above) via computers
 Simulation video game, a video game that is a computer simulation
 Simulation preorder, a relation between state transition systems in computer science
 Diving (association football) (also known as simulation), misconduct in association football

Media
 Simulation (film), a 2017 Iranian drama film
 Simulation (journal), a computer science academic journal 
 The Simulation, a 2019 album by American heavy metal band Born of Osiris
 "Simulation", song by Tkay Maidza from Tkay
 "Simulation", a house music song released in 2012 by Irish singer Róisín Murphy

See also
 Simulator (disambiguation)
 Simulation hypothesis